The Scheele Award is a scientific award given by the Swedish , an organisation mainly consisting of pharmacists. The award is given to commemorate the pharmacist and chemist Carl Wilhelm Scheele (1742–1786) and has been appointed since 1961, in the beginning annually but later biannually. The award is given to "a particularly prominent and internationally renowned pharmaceutical scientist".

A symposium, the Scheele Symposium, on the topics of interest of the laureate in question is held in November, in connection with the prize ceremony.

List of laureates 

1961 Frank Rose
1962 Peter Doyle
1963 
1964 Lewis H. Sarett
1965 Paul Janssen
1966 no prize was given
1967 Bernard B. Brodie
1968 Arnold Beckett
1969 Takeru Higuchi
1970 
1971 Albert Hofmann
1972 Carl Djerassi
1973 
1974 E.J. Ariens
1975 Edward P. Abraham
1976 
1977 Hans W. Kosterlitz
1978 
1979 
1980 
1981 George Aghajanian
1982 Charles Weissmann
1983 James W. Black
1984 Malcolm Rowland
1985 Stanley S. Davis
1986 Luc Montagnier
1987 
1988 David V. Goeddel
1989 
1990 
1991 K. Barry Sharpless
1992 Koji Nakanishi
1993 
1994 Greg Winter
1995 
1996 
1997 Julian E. Davies
1998 
1999 John W. Daly
2000 Douwe Breimer
2001 Andrew H. Wyllie
2003 
2005 
2007 Mathias Uhlén
2009 Dennis J. Slamon
2011 Kathleen Giacomini
2013 Garret A. FitzGerald
2015 Robert S. Langer
2017 Charles Sawyers
2019 Emmanuelle Charpentier
2021 Craig Crews

Notes

External links
 

Pharmacy awards
Swedish science and technology awards